A cellular space is a Hausdorff space that has the structure of a CW complex.

Compactness (mathematics)
General topology
Properties of topological spaces
Topology